Oluwasheun Ayotomiwa A. Bolarinwa (born 21 January 1990) is an English professional footballer who plays for Ashford United  as a winger.

Primarily playing on the right-wing, he began his career at Barnet in 2006 where he was a youth trainee in the academy. He then switched to Croydon Athletic playing in their youth team for a season. A brief spell with Dulwich Hamlet, before playing two seasons back at Croydon where he helped them win promotion as champions. He then played ten games for Billericay Town and Kingstonian.

After a trial period with Wycombe Wanderers, he made a switch to Thailand, joining Thai Division 1 Club, Suphanburi, in his first season he made 15 appearances and scored 8 goals; further spells in the Thai divisions with Bangkok, Nakhon Nayok and Udon Thani where helped them attain second-place and qualification into the champions league.

After spending three years in the Thai leagues, Bolarinwa moved back to England where he spent the closing weeks of the 2014–15 season at Cray Wanderers, before a move to National League South side Sutton United. He was pivotal to the club being promoted as champions with a number of man of the match performances and amassing 11 goals in the league and 15 total. His impressive form led to him earning a move to newly promoted League Two side Grimsby Town.

Club career
Bolarinwa was born in Greenwich, London. He started his football career in the Youth Alliance League with Barnet then went on to play senior football at Dulwich Hamlet making 6 appearances and scoring 4 goals. In 2008, he joined Croydon Athletic, as a right midfielder where he was in the winning team that won the Ryman Division 1 for the first time in their history. During his time with Croydon Athletic he made 40 appearances, scoring 13 goals. In September 2010 Bolarinwa spent a short spell at Billericay Town where he made 10 appearances, scoring 5 goals, before being released on November 2010. He then had a spell at Kingstonian where he made 10 appearances.

Thai Leagues
After a trial period with Wycombe Wanderers, Bolarinwa joined Thai League 1 club, Muangthong United and was then loaned out to Suphanburi. In his first season, he made 15 appearances and scored 8 goals. In 2013, he played for Regional League Division 2 side Nakhon Nayok, he made 9 appearances and scored one goal. In 2014 Bolarinwa joined Udon Thani where he made 21 appearances and scored 7 goals, helping them finish in second place and qualification to the Champions League Round.

Sutton United
Bolarinwa spent a few weeks with Isthmian League Division One North side Cray Wanderers. They won every game in which he played, making what had seemed an unlikely escape from relegation. Bolarinwa then signed a two-year contract with National League South side Sutton United on a free transfer. He made he debut for the club, coming off the bench in the 2–0 home defeat to Maidstone United. Bolarinwa scored his first goal for the club on 19 September 2015 in the 2–0 away win at Weston-super-Mare, scoring the second goal in the 30th minute, a pass fed into the path of Bolarinwa midway in the Weston half from Craig Eastmond, Bolarinwa ran forward dinking inside and outside to avoid two challenges before striking a 25-yard low shot, which curled away from the out-stretched dive of Purnell into the far bottom corner of the net.

Bolarinwa played a crucial role in Sutton United being promoted to the National League for the first time in sixteen years. His efforts over the season earned him a place in the 2015–16 National League team of the year.

Grimsby Town
Bolarinwa joined League Two side Grimsby Town on 15 June 2016 on a three-year contract for an undisclosed fee. He made his debut on 6 August 2016 in the opening game of the 2016–17 season in Grimsby's 2–0 home victory against Morecambe.

In November 2017, Bolarinwa returned to Sutton United on loan.

Return to Non-League
On 9 January 2018 Bolarinwa returned to Sutton United on a permanent deal. After two and a half seasons, he left the club on the expiry of his contract on 30 June 2020.

Bolarinwa joined Lewes in September 2020.

At the beginning of the 2021–22 season, Bolarinwa moved to Ashford United.

Style of play
Bolarinwa primarily plays as a winger, he can also play behind a striker as an attacking midfielder, as well as both flanks. A very direct type of player, he is able to dribble at pace and use trickery to get past the opponents players, also he's able to hold the ball up to bring other players into play.

Career statistics

<div>

Personal life
Bolarinwa has a younger brother, winger/right-back Moses Odubajo, who plays for Queens Park Rangers. Both are eligible to play for England or Nigeria respectively as they are of Nigerian descent.
Bolarinwa was orphaned at the age of 15 when his mother died of malaria and from that age he lived alone with his younger brother.

Honours

Player
Croydon Athletic
Isthmian League Division One South champions: 2009–10

Udon Thani
Division 2 North Eastern second-place(Q): 2014

Sutton United
National League South champions: 2015–16

Individual
National League South Team of the Year:  2015–16

References

External links
Tom Bolarinwa – Player Profile at Grimsby Town F.C. Official Site

1990 births
Living people
Footballers from Greenwich
English footballers
English expatriate footballers
English people of Nigerian descent
Isthmian League players
National League (English football) players
English Football League players
Association football wingers
Dulwich Hamlet F.C. players
Croydon Athletic F.C. players
Kingstonian F.C. players
Tom Bolarinwa
Tom Bolarinwa
Tom Bolarinwa
Cray Wanderers F.C. players
Sutton United F.C. players
Grimsby Town F.C. players
Lewes F.C. players
Ashford United F.C. players
Black British sportsmen
English expatriate sportspeople in Thailand
Expatriate footballers in Thailand